Ioan Mirea (1912–1987) was a Romanian painter, graphic artist, and member of the Iron Guard.

External links
Biography (in Romanian)

1912 births
1987 deaths
20th-century Romanian painters